Schaumainkai is a street in central Frankfurt, Germany, running along the south side of the river Main. It includes a number of museums including the Städel. Because of the large concentration of museums on the riverside, the area is called Museumsufer ("Museum Embankment").

The street is sometimes partially closed to traffic and used for Frankfurt's largest flea market.

See also 
 Museumsufer
 Sachsenhausen (Frankfurt am Main)

External links 
 Panoramic view

Streets in Frankfurt